Coda is a surname. Notable people with the surname include:

Paolo Coda di Cava, Naples, Italy - 1493 - Architect. Ref. "Holy Naples - a guide to the city's churches", edited by Elio de Rosa.
Benedetto Coda (died 1535), Italian painter of the Renaissance. He was active in Rimini from the years 1495 to 1508. Only a few works remain in Rimini, Pesaro and Ravenna dated from 1520 to 1530.
 Bartolomeo Coda painter and son of Benedetto. His works, "The Saint Rocco of Pesaro" - dated 1528, and "The Annunciation to Our Lady of the Mountain of Cesena", dated 1541, are well known.
 Marcantonio Coda born in 1630 in the Kingdom of Napoli (Italy). He was a lawyer, painter and agronomist. His paintings are in San Giovanni Maggiore church, Naples, and he wrote a famous agronomy treaty : "Breve discorso del principio, privilegii, et istruttioni della regia dohana della mena delle pecore in Puglia".
William F. Cody (USA 1846-1917) nicknamed Buffalo Bill by the men of the Union Pacific Railway whom he supplied with buffalo meat. He became famous for downing a record 4280 buffaloes in eight months.
Francesco Coda, Avella 1858 - Naples 1933. Ecclesiastic painter (gold decorations in the Gesu' Nuovo church - Naples).
Samuel Franklin Cody, Iowa USA 1867 - Farnborough UK 1913. The first man to build and fly a powered aeroplane in Britain in the year 1908. His pioneering motorised flights took place at Farnborough, a place destined to become the heart of world-wide experimental flying, known as the RAE (Royal Aircraft Establishment). He died during a test flight and his tomb is at the Aldershot Military Cemetery (UK).
Mario Coda Nunziante, Turin 1885 - Naples 1950, Marquis of San Ferdinando.
John Coda, (born Los Angeles 1932) American composer with a focus on film music and television scoring.
Luigi Coda Nunziante, Naples 1933 - Florence 2015. Marquis and praised officer with the Italian Navy.
Cub Koda (1948-2000), American rock and roll singer, guitarist, songwriter
Luigi Coda (born 1949), Aviator and Flight Test Engineer, Naples (Italy) and Warton (England).
Piero Coda (born 1955), Italian Theologian.
Gakuto Coda (born 1977), Japanese light novelist.
Andrea Coda (born 1985), Italian football (soccer) player.
Massimo Coda (born 1988), Italian footballer (soccer).

ETYMOLOGY

It is likely that the origin of this family name can be found in the following factors:
CODA, which means "tail" or "queue", is the Italian equivalent of the Latin CAUDA, and both are surnames currently used in Italy.
Surnames are frequently associated with geographical names such as towns, rivers, mountains, etcetera. In this case both CODA and CAUDA find their roots in the name of the SAMNITE city of CAUDIO, approximately thirty miles East of Naples.
In ancient Italy, the inland area between the South of Rome and north-east of Naples, pre-eminently mountainous with only a few plains, was inhabited by a true Italic people called OSCII which subdivided itself in Irpini (those which inhabited the Avellino area), Samnites (those which inhabited the Caserta  area) and Caudinii (those which inhabited the cities of Caudium and Abella, today's Avella). Together, they formed the Samnite League against the Romans both in the second and third Samnite wars, in the years 326 BC and 289 BC, for the domain of the eastbound route through the "Caudium canyon" in the Italian Pennines. The conflict between the power of Rome and the prowess of the Samnites lasted 300 years. According to history, in one of the shrewdest battles, Rome was defeated and made to kneel under the "Caudium forculae".In the aftermath the younger "Caudini" spread around as praised mercenaries.

THE OLDEST RECORD SO FAR

According to the ancient Italian book titled "Cenni storici sulla origine della citta' di Foggia (Historical accounts on the origin of the city of Foggia) written by Casimiro Perifani and edited by Tipografia Giacomo Russo of Foggia in 1831 (original at the Harvard College Library) "In the Gerosolimitani Knights roll, one can find members belonging to the families of Brayda, Reccho, Sereno and Belvedere. The "Coda" family (Cauda in French) followed King Charles I of Anjou  to Foggia (invasion of Naples and Palermo in 1248) and gave to the city many Doctors and Knights to the extent that King Charles V, on the date of 14 February 1535, conceded to Octavio Coda the diploma of "Magnifico"... member of our Royal family and a golden Knight in arms.

THE IRISH CONNECTION (Coda, Cody, Codd, Codds)

Descendants of Odo le Archdeacon (Mac Oda = sons of Odo), whose original lands lay in County Kilkenny and who lived in the early thirteenth century. The form Archdeacon remained interchangeable with McCody until the seventeenth century, when the latter dropped its Mac. Cody is much more common than Archdeacon today, although the latter is not extinct. In the sixteenth century the surname was confined to Kilkenny and Tipperary, where it is still most numerous today, while it has spread further afield in the interim. Buffalo Bill Cody's ancestors hailed from Tipperary. 
Although originally all CODY'S were Archdeacons the patronymic MacOda assumed by the Norman family in the course of time, superseded it and spread around. The name in Irish is Mac ODA, and was derived from Odo le Ercedekne, whose family had settled in County Kilkenny at the beginning of the 13th century. They were prominent in the history of that county until the final conquest of Ireland by England in the 17th century. The Ormond Deeds and the medieval ecclesiastical records have a great many references to them. In 1659, when the 'census' of Ireland was taken, they were listed among the principal Irish names.
The Irish Coda (Cody) settlers came, evidently, from the South of England (Cornwall) where the Norman invaders had already moved (William the Conqueror and Domesday in 1066) with the consent of the Church of Rome who financed the operation and provided "Samnite mercenaries" from the Caudium area. In Ireland the name (and word) Coda is used also to mean "the Law of our Lord".

References

Japanese-language surnames